The Utah State Aggies football statistical leaders are individual statistical leaders of the Utah State Aggies football program in various categories, including passing, rushing, receiving, total offense, defensive stats, and kicking. Within those areas, the lists identify single-game, single-season, and career leaders. The Aggies represent Utah State University in the NCAA's Mountain West Conference.

Although Utah State began competing in intercollegiate football in 1892, the school's official record book considers the "modern era" to have begun in 1956. Records from before this year are often incomplete and inconsistent, and they are generally not included in these lists.

These lists are dominated by more recent players for several reasons:
 Since 1956, seasons have increased from 10 games to 11 and then 12 games in length.
 The NCAA didn't allow freshmen to play varsity football until 1972 (with the exception of the World War II years), allowing players to have four-year careers.
 Bowl games only began counting toward single-season and career statistics in 2002. The Aggies have played in seven bowl games since this decision (all since 2011), giving many recent players an extra game to accumulate statistics.
 In 2014, Utah State not only appeared in a bowl game but also played a 13-game regular season. The NCAA allows teams that play at Hawaii in a given season to schedule a 13th regular-season game. The Aggies played at Hawaii and chose to take advantage of this rule. (However, they did not play a 13th regular-season game in 2018, the next season in which they played at Hawaii.)

These lists are updated through the end of the 2019 season.

Note that recent Utah State football media guides have not included lists of top performances for most single-game records, instead listing only the record holder (ties included). Exceptions are single-game rushing, passing, and receiving yards, which each have a full top 20 list.

Passing

Passing yards

Passing touchdowns

Rushing

Rushing yards

Rushing touchdowns

Receiving

Receptions

Receiving yards

Receiving touchdowns

Total offense
Total offense is the sum of passing and rushing statistics. It does not include receiving or returns.

Total offense yards

Total touchdowns
Utah State media guides as recently as 2016 listed the career top 5 for this statistic, which the program calls "touchdowns responsible". However, the 2018 media guide lists only the career record holder. All recent media guides have listed only the single-season and single-game record holders for this statistic.

Interestingly, the 2018 media guide lists a full top 10 in career and single-season touchdowns scored, which is an entirely different statistical measure. That metric includes rushing, receiving, and return touchdowns, but not passing touchdowns.

Defense

Interceptions

Tackles

Sacks

Special teams

Field goals made

Field goal percentage
Utah State requires 10 attempts to qualify for the single-season accuracy record, and 20 attempts to qualify for the career record.

References

Utah State